Winter Kill is a 1974 American made-for-television mystery-thriller film directed by Jud Taylor and written by  John Michael Hayes and David Karp. It stars Andy Griffith as Sam McNeill, the police chief in a small resort town in the mountains of northern California. The film is mystery-suspense drama about McNeill's attempts to solve a string of local serial killings linked by messages left at the scenes of the crimes. Nick Nolte played the role of Dave Michaels.

The movie (which aired on April 15, 1974 as an ABC Movie of the Week) was intended as a series pilot.  When it failed to sell, the main character was renamed and used as the lead character for the short-lived 1975 series Adams of Eagle Lake, also starring Andy Griffith.

The film was released on DVD by Warner Bros. in 2009 along with Griffith's 1977 TV movie Deadly Game, making it one of the few of Griffith's TV movies from the 1970s to have an official DVD release.

External links

1974 television films
1974 films
ABC Movie of the Week
Films directed by Jud Taylor
Films scored by Jerry Goldsmith
Films with screenplays by John Michael Hayes
American thriller television films
1970s American films